The Palmyra-Eagle Area School District is a school district in the U.S. state of Wisconsin that serves Jefferson, Walworth, and Waukesha counties. The district serves  students from the villages of Palmyra and  Eagle and the towns of Palmyra, Eagle,  La Grange, and Sullivan.

History
  
The district has been a K-12 system since 1931 as Palmyra School District, and in 1971, reorganized with the Eagle State Graded School District, which detached from the Mukwonago Union High School District.  It has been known officially as Palmyra-Eagle Area School District since 1974. In 1987 a new elementary school in Eagle was built. In 2005 the middle school was moved from Palmyra Elementary School to Palmyra-Eagle High School. Today the district is served by a shared high school and middle school building in Palmyra and one elementary building in Eagle.

On July 1, 2019, the school board of the Palmyra-Eagle School District voted to dissolve the district. The district cited a lack of funding necessary to continue operations past the 2019–2020 school year. The school board voted in April 2020 to keep the district open.

Schools

Palmyra-Eagle Schools includes
Palmyra-Eagle Middle-High School
Eagle Elementary

Administration

District
Dr. Todd Gray -  District Administrator
Kay Leigh Sockrider - Special Education Director/Pupil & Learning Services

Schools
Kari Timm - High School / Middle School Principal
Joel Tortomasi - District Associate Principal
Katie Robertson - Eagle Elementary School Principal
Kevin Wilde - Athletic Director

External links 
Palmyra-Eagle Area School District Facebook Page

Education in Jefferson County, Wisconsin
Education in Walworth County, Wisconsin
Education in Waukesha County, Wisconsin
School districts in Wisconsin

References